The 14085 / 14086 Sirsa Express is an Express train belonging to Northern Railway zone that runs between  and  in India. It is currently being operated with 14085/14086 train numbers on a daily basis.

Service

The 14085/Sirsa Express has an average speed of 43 km/hr and covers 265 km in 6h 20m. The 14086/Sirsa Express has an average speed of 43 km/hr and covers 265 km in 6h 15m. (55 km/h without including halt time)

Route and halts 

The important halts of the train are:

Coach composition

The train has standard ICF rakes with max speed of 100 kmph. The train consists of 22 coaches:

 20 General
 1 General (reserve for female)
 1 AC Chair Car

Traction

Both trains are hauled by a Ludhiana Loco Shed-based WDP-4D diesel locomotive engine (electric engine between Tilak Bridge and Bhiwani) from Tilak Bridge to Sirsa and vice versa.

Direction reversal

The train reverses its direction 1 times:

See also 

 Tilak Bridge railway station
 Sirsa railway station
 Kisan Express

Notes

References

External links 

 14085/Sirsa Express
 14086/Sirsa Express

Transport in Delhi
Named passenger trains of India
Rail transport in Delhi
Rail transport in Haryana
Railway services introduced in 2009
Express trains in India